Judgement 2011 was a professional wrestling event promoted by DDT Pro-Wrestling (DDT). It took place on March 27, 2011, in Tokyo, Japan, at the Korakuen Hall. It was the fifteenth event under the Judgement name. The event aired domestically on Fighting TV Samurai.

Storylines
Judgement 2011 featured six professional wrestling matches that involved different wrestlers from pre-existing scripted feuds and storylines. Wrestlers portrayed villains, heroes, or less distinguishable characters in the scripted events that built tension and culminated in a wrestling match or series of matches.

Event

The fourth match was the first stage in a series dubbed "Bob Sapp's Games" where Sapp would send surprise "assassins" to try and take out Danshoku Dino before their match on July 24, at Ryōgoku Peter Pan 2011. The first "assassin" was Jonathan Gresham who made his first and only DDT appearance.

Next was the "KO-D Openweight Championship Contendership + α Right To Challenge Anytime, Anywhere Contract Royal Rumble", a Rumble rules match in which the winner would receive a title match against the KO-D Openweight Champion on May 5, at Max Bump 2011. Additionally, two envelopes were suspended above the ring. Each envelope contained a Right To Challenge Anytime, Anywhere contract, giving their holder the right to challenge for any title at any moment in the next year. Grabbing an envelope resulted in being eliminated from the match.

Results

KO-D Openweight Championship Contendership + α Right To Challenge Anytime, Anywhere Contract Royal Rumble

References

External links
The official DDT Pro-Wrestling website

2011
2011 in professional wrestling
Professional wrestling in Tokyo